Ralph Cram may refer to:

 Ralph Adams Cram (1863–1942), American architect
 Ralph W. Cram (1869–1952), American journalist and newspaper editor